Claude Hubert (16 March 1914 – 12 December 1977) was a French racewalker. He competed in the men's 50 kilometres walk at the 1948 Summer Olympics and the 1952 Summer Olympics.

References

1914 births
1977 deaths
Athletes (track and field) at the 1948 Summer Olympics
Athletes (track and field) at the 1952 Summer Olympics
French male racewalkers
Olympic athletes of France
Place of birth missing